The Girl in the Woods is an American horror television series created by Crypt TV, which premiered on Peacock on October 21, 2021. It follows the story of a secret door protected by a cult, whose children suffer the aftermath after deciding to open it. The show stars Stefanie Scott, Misha Osherovich, and Sofia Bryant.

The series was created following the success of two similarly-titled short films, which it is loosely based on. The Girl in the Woods earned positive reviews from critics, who praised the scares and the performance of Scott, however some found its plot to be formulaic.

Cast

Main
 Stefanie Scott as Carrie 
 Misha Osherovich as Nolan
 Sofia Bryant as Tasha

Recurring
 Will Yun Lee as Arthur Dean
 Kylie Liya Page as Sara
 Reed Diamond as Hosea
 Leonard Roberts as Alex

Episodes

Production

Background

Preceding short films 
The Brute is a powerful creature that passes through a tear between dimensions. It is tall and sinewy, with slimy, peach skin, eyes veiled by flesh and massive, sharp teeth. It effortlessly decapitates its victims before devouring the flesh off of their bones. It carries a brand on its head, the same symbol worn on the clothing of the cult members.

The Door in the Woods premiered on YouTube in 2019. In The Door in the Woods, the children of a rural cult decide to open a locked door that their families have sworn to protect. Opening the door unleashes The Brute, a terrifying, supernatural creature. The monster devours Ben, the boy who opened the door, and quickly goes on a rampage through the compound, picking off cult members one-by-one. Carrie, the last child alive in the cult, manages to close the door, but not before losing both parents and her left arm. The Door in the Woods was directed by Joey Greene. Mark Villalobos was in charge of creature design and makeup special effects.

On October 18, 2019, Crypt TV announced a sequel to The Door in the Woods, to be called The Girl in the Woods. In the sequel, AD (Kal Penn) rescues Carrie, the titular girl in the woods, who helped unleash The Brute. Seven years later, adult Carrie (Peyton List) thinks back on life with AD and the fateful day the Brute got loose. AD trains Carrie to defend herself against The Brute and reminds her never to open the Door. When she's ready, he gives her a new arm that he has constructed out of metal, with a special blade made of material mined from the ground near the Door. With this blade, Carrie can defend herself against any of the creatures that come from the “wound” behind the door, including The Brute. The Girl in the Woods was written by David Calbert and Van Nguyen, and directed by Roxine Helberg.

Development
On Thursday, April 29, 2021, Crypt TV announced that The Girl in the Woods was picked up as an eight-episode series on NBC’s streaming network Peacock, to premiere in October 2021. The series will have a different cast from the movies. Krysten Ritter (Jessica Jones) will direct the first four episodes, including the pilot, with Jacob Chase (Come Play) directing the other five episodes. Jane Casey Modderno (The Birch) was named head writer.

Casting
On May 10, 2021 Peacock announced the cast with Stefanie Scott in the lead role, Misha Osherovich and Sofia Bryant as series regualars and Will Yun Lee, Kylie Liya Page, Reed Diamond and Leonard Roberts in recurring roles.

Reception 
The series has a 71% fresh rating on website Rotten Tomatoes based on seven reviews with an average score of 5.7/10.

References

External links 
 
 

Peacock (streaming service) original programming
2021 American television series debuts
2021 American television series endings
2020s American supernatural television series